Yona Sabar (born 1938 in Zakho, Iraq) is a Kurdistani Jewish scholar, linguist and researcher. He is professor emeritus of Hebrew at the University of California, Los Angeles. He is a native speaker of Northeastern Neo-Aramaic and has published more than 90 research articles about Jewish Neo-Aramaic and the folklore of the Jews of Kurdistan.

Sabar was born in the town of Zakho in northern Iraq. His family moved to Israel in 1951. He received a B.A. in Hebrew and Arabic from the Hebrew University of Jerusalem in 1963 and a Ph.D. in Near Eastern Languages and Literatures from Yale University in 1970.

His immigrant journey from the hills of Kurdistan to the highways of Los Angeles is the subject of an award-winning memoir by his son, Ariel Sabar, an American author and journalist. Ariel Sabar's book My Father's Paradise: A Son's Search for his Jewish Past in Kurdish Iraq won the 2008 National Book Critics Circle Award for autobiography.

Works
The Folk Literature of the Kurdistani Jews: An Anthology, Yale University Press, 232 pp., 1982.

References

External links
Yona Sabar's UCLA website
My Father's Paradise by Ariel Sabar
Hollywood Calling by Ariel Sabar
Prof. Sabar on the claim that Barzani is Jewish by JTA

Iraqi Jews
Iraqi emigrants to Israel
Kurdish Jews
1938 births
Living people
Hebrew University of Jerusalem alumni
Yale University alumni
University of California, Los Angeles faculty
University of California Near Eastern Languages and Cultures faculty
Kurdish scholars
Kurdish social scientists
American people of Iraqi-Assyrian descent
People from Zakho